The Lone Wolf Returns is a 1926 American silent mystery film directed by Ralph Ince and starring Bert Lytell, Billie Dove, and Freeman Wood.

Cast
 Bert Lytell as Michael Lanyard  
 Billie Dove as Marcia Mayfair  
 Freeman Wood as Mallison  
 Gustav von Seyffertitz as Morphew  
 Gwen Lee as Liane De Lorme 
 Alphonse Ethier as Crane

References

Bibliography
 Quinlan, David. The Illustrated Guide to Film Directors. Batsford, 1983.

External links

1926 films
Films directed by Ralph Ince
American silent feature films
1920s English-language films
American black-and-white films
Columbia Pictures films
American mystery films
1920s mystery films
1926 crime drama films
The Lone Wolf films
1920s American films
Silent mystery films
Silent American drama films